Lori Jo Pierce is an American radiation oncologist and 57th President of the American Society of Clinical Oncology. She is a Full Professor and Vice Provost for Academic and Faculty Affairs at the University of Michigan. Her research focuses on the use of radiotherapy in the multi-modality treatment of breast cancer, with emphasis on intensity modulated radiotherapy in node positive breast cancer, the use of radiosensitizing agents, and the outcomes of women treated with radiation for breast cancer who are carriers of a BRCA1/2 breast cancer susceptibility gene.

In 2019, Pierce was elected a member of the National Academy of Medicine in recognition of her “research in developing radiation treatments for breast cancer that leverage advances in medical physics and laboratory science and for national efforts to draw women and people of color into medicine."

Early life and education
Pierce was born and raised in Washington, D.C. by parents Melvin H. Pierce and Amy Martin Pierce.  When her father relocated to Philadelphia due to work, she followed her family there. Pierce spent her summers in Ahoskie, North Carolina where she was inspired to pursue a career in medicine from an African-American family doctor. While attending Philadelphia High School for Girls, she was named one of 394 winners in the 11th Annual National Achievement Scholarship Program for Outstanding Negro Students. When speaking of her schooling experiences, Pierce said: "I had a terrific educational experience in public schools. I graduated from a high school in Philadelphia that was considered a college preparatory school. So, by the time I entered college, I was academically grounded."

Following high school, Pierce completed her undergraduate degree with a major in biomedical engineering and a minor in chemical engineering at the University of Pennsylvania. After being accepted in Duke University School of Medicine, she deferred her admission so she could work as an engineer and earn enough money to pay for school. Upon receiving her medical degree in 1985, Pierce completed her residency in Radiation Oncology at the Hospital of the University of Pennsylvania. During her residency, Pierce wrote a seminal paper on radiation and breast-conserving surgery in African American women compared with their white counterparts. This began her interest in medical racism; the racial bias in medicine and specifically against black women.

Career
Following her residency, Pierce accepted an assistant professor position at the Perelman School of Medicine at the University of Pennsylvania, after which she served at the National Cancer Institute (NCI) as a senior investigator in the radiation oncology branch from 1990 to 1992. During her final year at NCI, Pierce published "Conservative surgery and radiation therapy in black women with early stage breast cancer: Patterns of failure and analysis of outcome," which found that overall survival of breast-conserving surgery and radiation therapy was worse among black patients. After spending two years at NCI, Pierce joined the faculty of the University of Michigan in 1992 as a research investigator and assistant professor. In 1998, she was promoted to associate professor and listed by Castle Connolly as one of "America’s Top Doctors for Breast Cancer." At the turn of the century, she led a study finding that "women with mutations of the BRCA 1 or 2 gene who had breast-conserving surgery after cancer diagnosis may get the same benefit from radiation therapy with no greater incidence of short- or long-term side effects as women with non-hereditary cancer." In August 2005, Pierce was appointed by the University of Michigan Board of Regents to be Vice Provost for Academic and Faculty Affairs. As a result, she held a part-time appointment in the Office of the Provost while remaining active on a part-time basis in the Medical School. In recognition of her efforts, Pierce was one of 11 physicians selected nationwide as a fellow of the American Society of Radiation Oncology and became a Susan G. Komen for the Cure Scholar.

During her tenure at the University of Michigan, Pierce's research has focused on "the use of radiotherapy in the multi-modality treatment of breast cancer, with emphasis on intensity-modulated radiotherapy in node-positive breast cancer, the use of radiosensitizing agents, and the outcomes of women treated with radiation for breast cancer who are carriers of a BRCA1/2 breast cancer susceptibility gene." In 2017, Pierce was co-honored by United Way with Robert E. Guenzel Award, the top annual honor given to area United Way supporters for their help in the community. She was later recognized by the American Society of Clinical Oncology (ASCO) with the Special Awards and Conquer Cancer's Women Who Conquer Cancer Mentorship Awards. A few years later, Pierce was elected a member of the National Academy of Medicine in recognition of her “research in developing radiation treatments for breast cancer that leverage advances in medical physics and laboratory science and for national efforts to draw women and people of color into medicine." She was also elected president of ASCO for a four-year term starting in June 2020.  During the COVID-19 pandemic, Pierce co-authored a study led by Reshma Jagsi focusing on medical racism which causes radiation side effects to be missed in young black patients. In her role as president, she also announced a health equity theme (“Equity: Every Patient. Every Day. Everywhere.”) for her ASCO presidency.

References

Living people
American oncologists
American radiologists
Women radiologists
Women oncologists
Duke University School of Medicine alumni
University of Pennsylvania School of Arts and Sciences alumni
University of Michigan faculty
Members of the National Academy of Medicine
Year of birth missing (living people)